Sant'Angelo Le Fratte is a town and comune in the province of Potenza, in the Southern Italian region of Basilicata. As of 2011 its population was of 1,457.

Geography
Located near the borders with Campania, Sant'Angelo is bounded by the comuni of Brienza, Caggiano (SA), Polla (SA), Satriano di Lucania, Savoia di Lucania, and Tito. It counts the hamlets (frazioni) of Farisi, Isca, Santa Maria Fellana, and San Vito.

Demographics

References

External links

 Sant'Angelo Le Fratte official website

Cities and towns in Basilicata